"The Door" is a song by the Australian rock band Silverchair, released as the last single from their second album, Freak Show. The band's vocalist and guitarist Daniel Johns said "It's influenced a lot by Led Zeppelin and anything from that era really. Before the album, when I actually wrote it and showed Ben and Chris, Ben and Chris liked it and they wanted to continue working on it and write a bit more, and I didn't really like the song. And they were like, 'oh, come on, we'll just use it' and so I said, 'yeah all right,' just to see how it would turn out. And it ended up changed a little bit and now I'm really happy with it."

Track listing
Australian CD single (MATTCD062); Cassette (MATTC062)
 "The Door"
 "Surfin' Bird" (cover)
 "Roses" (live)
 "Minor Threat" (live cover)
 "Madman" (live)"

Limited Australian 7" (MATTV062)
 "The Door"
 "Surfin' Bird" (cover)
 "Roses" (live cover)
 "Minor Threat" (live cover)

The three live songs were recorded in Chicago's Aragon Ballroom on 20 April 1997. Jeremy Chatelain from the band Handsome sings on "Minor Threat".

Charts

References

1997 singles
Silverchair songs
Songs written by Daniel Johns
Song recordings produced by Nick Launay
1997 songs